Tatiana Saunders (born 3 July 1993) is an English footballer who plays as a goalkeeper for Durham playing in the FA Women's Championship after leaving Lewes. Saunders played with the New York Athletic Club, where she was part of the squad that won the 2010 USASA Women's Cup, and was named the 2010 Gatorade State Player of the Year for New York. She played internationally for the England under-17s and under-19s with a perfect  record, and was also on the Dartmouth women's soccer team for four years. After a two-year stint working on Wall Street, Saunders resumed her football career in 2018 and has since played in Iceland and France.

Life and career 
By the age of six, Saunders was starting to play soccer in Rye, New York. She also played varsity soccer in Rye. She served as captain for her last two years of high school, leading her team to the New York State Class A Championship in 2008 as well as the finals in 2010. During her senior year, Saunders had 16 shutouts, giving up only five goals in 23 games. Her team finished the season , ranking eighth nationally in the ESPN RISE rankings.

At the age of 13, she started playing for New York Athletic Club in the Women's Premier Soccer League. Her squad won the 2010 USASA National Women's Cup, and Saunders was named the 2010 Gatorade State Player of the Year for New York. In 2016 Saunders remained with New York Athletic Club. She was the club's longest-serving player, participating in her eighth season.

Her international football career started as a teen, when she was selected for the England national women's under-17 and under-19 teams. She kept a perfect  record across all appearances. Saunders appeared as goalkeeper for the England U19s during qualifying matches for the 2011 Women's U19 European Championships in Italy, and travelled with the team to countries including Moldova and Macedonia. Her England teammates included Danielle Carter and Nikita Parris.

From 2011 to 2015, Saunders attended Dartmouth College, where she played regularly for the Dartmouth Big Green women's soccer team. Saunders was an All-Ivy First Team honoree in 2012 and an All-Ivy Second Team honoree in 2014. She was named to the NSCAA All-Region Second Team her sophomore season.

After graduation, Saunders worked in finance on Wall Street for two years. She was unable to play professionally due to work commitments, and longed to return to football. When Icelandic team FH women's football contacted her agent looking for a goalkeeper, she agreed to a tryout in January 2018. In February, she signed a contract to play for FH women in the  Pepsi League starting in the summer. She played five matches for FH, finishing the season on loan at Reykjavik Athletic Club (ÍR) in the second tier Inkasso League.

For the 2018–2019 season, she joined the Croix de Savoie FA (Ambilly Feminin), in France. For the 2019–2020 season, she played for the Thonon Evian Grand Genève F.C. women's team in the Division 2 Féminine. Saunders says her most memorable match was playing against Olympique Lyonnais Féminin in the Women's French Cup in front of 3,000 fans.

In 2020, Saunders joined Lewes FC Women, taking the number one shirt as goalkeeper. She was one of eight new players who made up Lewes' squad of 20 players (which included goalkeeper Laura Hartley) under manager Simon Parker. Lewes offers equal pay to its women's and men's teams – the first professional or semi-professional football club in the United Kingdom to do so.

In June 2021, she signed a new deal with Lewes. In 2020, Saunders said that she was pursuing an MBA degree simultaneously with her football career.

During the final match of the season in May 2022 she scored a goal against Liverpool. Her goal kick went over the head of her opposite number goalkeeper, Charlotte Clarke, to give Lewes a 2–1 win. In August 2022 she was playing for Durham.

References

External links 
 
 
 Tatiana Saunders at Footofeminin.fr 

1993 births
Women's association football goalkeepers
People from Rye, New York
FH women's football players
Living people
Lewes F.C. Women players
Soccer players from New York (state)
English expatriate sportspeople in the United States
English expatriate sportspeople in Iceland
English expatriate sportspeople in France
English women's footballers
Thonon Evian Grand Genève F.C. players
Sportspeople from Westchester County, New York
Úrvalsdeild kvenna (football) players
ÍR women's football players
Expatriate women's footballers in Iceland
Expatriate women's footballers in France
Expatriate women's soccer players in the United States
Dartmouth Big Green women's soccer players
Women's Premier Soccer League players